The 2006 Bandy World Championship was held in Sweden 28 January-5 February. There were men's national teams from 12 countries participating in the 2006 tournament: Belarus, Finland, Kazakhstan, Norway, Russia, Sweden (group A) and Canada, Estonia, Hungary, Mongolia, the Netherlands, the United States (group B).

Bidding
In February 2004, Hälsingland expressed its interest for hosting the tournament, with the final game intended to be played inside the Edsbyn Arena to avoid being affected by weather conditions.

Dalarna, Göteborg, Stockholm and Västerås also expressed their interests for hosting. On 27 November 2004, the Swedish Bandy Association announced that the tournament would be played either in Dalarna or in Stockholm. On 14 January 2005, it was announced that Stockholm would host the tournament.

Group A
  
  
  
 4th 
 5th 
 6th

Premier tour
 28 January
 Sweden – Kazakhstan 14–1
 Belarus – Finland 1–13
 Russia – Norway 12–2
 29 January
 Sweden – Finland 4–5
 Norway – Belarus 17–2
 Russia – Kazakhstan 21–3
 30 January
 Sweden – Belarus 13–1
 Kazakhstan – Norway 10–4
 31 January
 Russia – Finland 5–1
 1 February
 Finland – Norway 6–3
 Kazakhstan – Belarus 14–4
 Sweden – Russia 4–5
 2 February
 Sweden – Norway 6–2
 Russia – Belarus 9–4
 Finland – Kazakhstan 7–3

Final Tour

Semifinals
 4 February
 Russia – Kazakhstan 13–3
 Sweden – Finland 3–1

Match for 3rd place
 5 February
 Kazakhstan – Finland 4–7

Final
 5 February
 Russia – Sweden 3–2

Group B
Were played in Ekvallen in Gustavsberg, a bit outside Stockholm

Premier tour
 February 1
Mongolia – Estonia 4–3
USA – Hungary 10–1
Netherlands – Canada 0–9
USA – Estonia 8–0
Hungary – Canada 0–3
Mongolia – Netherlands 0–3
 February 2
Mongolia – USA 0–14
Netherlands – Hungary 1–3
Estonia – Canada 0–4
USA – Netherlands 14–0
Hungary – Estonia 3–2
Canada – Mongolia 4–0
 February 3
Estonia – Netherlands 1–3
Hungary – Mongolia 3–0
Canada – USA 1–4

Play off matches

Match for 4th Place
 February 4
 Netherlands – Mongolia 4–3

Match for 2nd Place
 February 4
 Canada – Hungary 5–0

A-group qualification match
 February 4
 Belarus – USA 3–2

References

2006
2006 in bandy
2006 in Swedish sport
International bandy competitions hosted by Sweden
January 2006 sports events in Europe
February 2006 sports events in Europe